is a railway station located in the town of Fukaura, Aomori Prefecture, Japan, operated by the East Japan Railway Company (JR East).

Lines

Station layout
Shikakamidaketozanguchi  Station has one ground-level side platform serving a single bi-directional track. The station is unattended, and is managed from Fukaura Station.

History
With the privatization of the JNR on April 1, 1987, it came under the operational control of JR East. The station was renamed to its present name of December 2, 2000.

Surrounding area

Shirakami-Sanchi

See also
 List of Railway Stations in Japan

References

External links

 

Stations of East Japan Railway Company
Railway stations in Aomori Prefecture
Gonō Line
Fukaura, Aomori
Railway stations in Japan opened in 1952